In 1998 the US Congress amended the Rehabilitation Act to require Federal agencies to make their electronic and information technology accessible to people with disabilities. Section 508 was enacted to eliminate barriers in information technology, to make available new opportunities for people with disabilities, and to encourage development of technologies that will help achieve these goals. The law applies to all Federal agencies when they develop, procure, maintain, or use electronic and information technology. Under Section 508, agencies must give employees with disabilities and members of the public access to information that is comparable to the access available to others.

History 
Section 508 was originally added as an amendment to the Rehabilitation Act of 1973 in 1986. The original section 508 dealt with electronic and information technologies, in recognition of the growth of this field.

In 1997, The Federal Electronic and Information Technology Accessibility and Compliance Act was proposed in the U.S. legislature to correct the shortcomings of the original section 508; the original Section 508 had turned out to be mostly ineffective, in part due to the lack of enforcement mechanisms. In the end, this Federal Electronic and Information Technology Accessibility and Compliance Act, with revisions, was enacted as the new Section 508 of the Rehabilitation Act of 1973, in 1998.

Section 508 addresses legal compliance through the process of market research and government procurement and also has technical standards against which products can be evaluated to determine if they meet the technical compliance. Because technology can meet the legal provisions and be legally compliant (e.g., no such product exists at time of purchase) but may not meet the United States Access Board's technical accessibility standards, users are often confused between these two issues. Additionally, evaluation of compliance can be done only when reviewing the procurement process and documentation used when making a purchase or contracting for development, the changes in technologies and standards themselves, it requires a more detailed understanding of the law and technology than at first seems necessary.

There is nothing in Section 508 that requires private web sites to comply unless they are receiving federal funds or under contract with a federal agency.  Commercial best practices include voluntary standards and guidelines as the World Wide Web Consortium's (W3C) Web Accessibility Initiative (WAI). Automatic accessibility checkers (engines) such as "IBM Rational Policy Tester" and AccVerify, refer to Section 508 guidelines but have difficulty in accurately testing content for accessibility.

In 2006, the United States Access Board organized the Telecommunications and Electronic and Information Technology Advisory Committee (TEITAC) to review and recommend updates to its Section 508 standards and Telecommunications Act Accessibility Guidelines. TEITAC issued its report to the Board in April 2008. The Board released drafts of proposed rules based on the committee's recommendations in 2010 and 2011 for public comment. In February 2015, the Board released a notice of proposed rulemaking for the Section 508 standards.

In 2017 the Section 508 Refresh came into effect. This was then updated a year later in January of 2018 to restore TTY access provisions. This refresh essentially aligned the web elements with the W3C's WCAG 2.0 AA criteria.

The law

Qualifications 
 Federal agencies can be in legal compliance and still not meet the technical standards. Section 508 §1194.3 General exceptions describe exceptions for national security (e.g., most of the primary systems used by the National Security Agency (NSA)), incidental items not procured as work products, individual requests for non-public access,   fundamental alteration of a product's key requirements, or maintenance access.
 In the case that implementation of such standards causes undue hardship to the Federal agency or department involved, such Federal agencies or departments are required to supply the data and information to covered disabled persons by alternative means that allow them to make use of such information and data.
 Section 508 requires that all Federal information that is accessible electronically must be accessible for those with disabilities.  This information must be accessible in a variety of ways, which are specific to each disability.
The Rehabilitation Act of 1973 requires that all federal agencies provide individuals with disabilities with reasonable accommodation, which falls into three categories: (1) modifications and adjustments must be made for a person with a disability to be considered for a job, (2) modifications and adjustments must be made in order for an individual to execute essential functions of the job, and (3) modifications or adjustments must be made in order to enable employees to have equal benefits and privileges
Some users may need certain software in order to be able to access certain information.
People with disabilities are not required to use specific wording when putting in a reasonable accommodation request when applying for a job. An agency must be flexible in processing all requests.  This means that agencies cannot adopt a "one-size fits all" approach.  Each process should be handled on a case-by-case basis.

Provisions 
The original legislation mandated that the Architectural and Transportation Barriers Compliance Board, known as the Access Board, establish a draft for their Final Standards for accessibility for such electronic and information technologies in December 2001. The final standards were approved in April 2001 and became enforceable on June 25, 2001.

The latest information about these standards and about support available from the Access Board in implementing them, as well as the results of surveys conducted to assess compliance, is available from the Board's newsletter Access Currents.  The Section 508 standards, tools, and resources are available from the Center for Information Technology Accommodation (CITA), in the U.S. General Services Administration's Office of Government-wide Policy.

Summary of Section 508 technical standards 
 Software Applications and Operating Systems: includes accessibility to software, e.g. keyboard navigation & focus is supplied by a web browser.
 Web-based Intranet and Internet Information and Applications: assures accessibility to web content, e.g., text description for any visuals such that users with a disability or users that need assistive technology such as screen readers and refreshable Braille displays, can access the content.
 Telecommunications Products: addresses accessibility for telecommunications products such as cell phones or voice mail systems. It includes addressing technology compatibility with hearing aids, assistive listening devices, and telecommunications devices for the deaf (TTYs).
 Videos or Multimedia Products: includes requirements for captioning and audio description of multimedia products such as training or informational multimedia productions.  
 Self Contained, Closed Products: products where end users cannot typically add or connect their own assistive technologies, such as information kiosks, copiers, and fax machines.  This standard links to the other standards and generally requires that access features be built into these systems.
 Desktop and Portable Computers: discusses accessibility related to standardized ports, and mechanically operated controls such as keyboards and touch screens.

Practice 
When evaluating a computer hardware or software product which could be used in a U.S. government agency, information technology managers now look to see if the vendor has provided an Accessibility Conformance Report (ACR). The most common ACR is known as Voluntary Product Accessibility Template® (VPAT®) although some departments historically promoted a Government Product Accessibility Template (GPAT). The VPAT template was created by the Information Technology Industry Council (ITI).  A VPAT lists potential attributes of the product that affect the degree to which it is accessible.  One issue is whether a software's functions can be executed from the keyboard, or whether they require the use of a mouse, because keyboards are usable by a wider spectrum of people.  Because colorblindness is common, another issue is whether the device or software communicates necessary information only by differences in displayed color.  Because not all users can hear, another issue is whether the device or software communicates necessary information in an auditory way.  If the product can be configured to the user's preferences on these dimensions, that is usually considered a satisfactory adaptation to the Section 508 requirements.  One challenge to the adoption of open-source software in the U.S. government has been that there is no vendor to provide support or write a VPAT, but a VPAT can be written by volunteers if they can find the necessary information.

See also
Computer accessibility
Section 504 of the Rehabilitation Act
Universal usability
Web Content Accessibility Guidelines
Web accessibility

References

Reuters, T. (2011). Rehabilitation act. Retrieved from Castro, I. The U.S. Equal Employment Opportunity Commission, (2000). Policy guidance on executive order 13164: establishing procedures to facilitate the provision of reasonable accommodation 
Weaver, T. Office of Governmentwide Policy, (2011). Section 508 laws

External links
 CITES/DRES Web Accessibility Best practices
 United States Access Board the Federal Agency responsible for Section 508 technical standards
 Section 508 Checklist from WebAIM.org
 USPS AS-508-A, Section 508 Technical Reference Guide in HTML Format
 Federal Register December 2000 Section 508 Electronic and information technology accessibility standards
 Federal Register April 2005 Section 508 related Federal Acquisition Rules
 Section508.gov - free Section 508 training.
 buyaccessible.gov/ - the place for Section 508 procurement assistance
 WCAG & Section 508 accessibility - The basic Section508 and WCAG requirements
Bureau of Internet Accessibility, Inc., The ultimate guide to website accessibility for Section 508 and WCAG 2.1 A/AA

Web accessibility
United States federal civil rights legislation
Disability legislation
1973 in law
Accessible Procurement